This is a list of islands of Djibouti:

Island in the Red Sea 
Doumeira

Islands in the Bab-el-Mandeb 
Seven Brothers
Siyyan Himar
 Rocher Siyyan

Islands in the Gulf of Tadjoura 
Maskali
Moucha
Abou Maya
Warramous

See also 
 Geography of Djibouti

Islands
Djibouti